Dalhousie-Restigouche East was a provincial electoral district for the Legislative Assembly of New Brunswick, Canada.

Members of the Legislative Assembly

Election results

References

External links 
Website of the Legislative Assembly of New Brunswick
Map of Dalhousie-Restigouche East riding (2010)

Former provincial electoral districts of New Brunswick